Campbell Soup Company, doing business as Campbell's, is an American processed food and snack company. The company is most closely associated with its flagship canned soup products; however, through mergers and acquisitions, it has grown to become one of the largest processed food companies in the U.S. with a wide variety of products under its flagship Campbell's brand as well as other brands like Pepperidge Farm, Snyder's of Hanover, V8, and Swanson. Under its brands, Campbell's produces soups and other canned meals, baked goods, beverages, and snacks. It is headquartered in Camden, New Jersey.

The classic red-and-white can design used by many Campbell's branded products has become an American icon, and its use in pop art was typified by Andy Warhol's series of Campbell's Soup Cans prints.

History

Foundation and early history 

The company was started in 1869 by Joseph A. Campbell, a fruit merchant from Bridgeton, New Jersey, and Abraham Anderson, an icebox manufacturer from South Jersey. They produced canned tomatoes, vegetables, jellies, soups, condiments, and minced meats.

In 1876, Anderson left the partnership and the company became the "Joseph A. Campbell Preserve Company". Anderson's son, Campbell Speelman, split paths with his father and continued to work at Campbell's as a creative director, originally designing the Campbell's Soup Cans.

In 1894, Campbell retired and Arthur Dorrance became the company president. Campbell reorganized into "Joseph Campbell & Co." in 1896. In 1897, John T. Dorrance, a nephew of company president Dorrance, began working for the company at a wage of $7.50 a week ($253 in 2022 dollars). Dorrance, a chemist with degrees from MIT and Göttingen University, Germany, developed a commercially viable method for condensing soup by halving the quantity of its heaviest ingredient: water. He went on to become president of the company from 1914 to 1930, eventually buying out the Campbell family.

In 1898, Herberton Williams, a Campbell's executive, convinced the company to adopt a carnelian red and bright white color scheme, because he was taken by the crisp carnelian red color of the Cornell University football team's uniforms. To this day, the layout of the can, with its red and white design and the metallic bronze medal seal from the 1900 Paris Exhibition, has changed very little, with the exception of the French phrase on the top of the bronze seal that said "Exposition-Universelle-Internationale" which was changed to the English name of the exhibition as "Paris International Exposition".

Growth under new leadership 
Campbell Soup became one of the largest food companies in the world under the leadership of William Beverly Murphy. He was elected executive vice president of Campbell Soup in 1949 and was president and CEO from 1953 to 1972. While at Campbell's Soup Company, he took the corporation public and increased its brand portfolio to include Pepperidge Farm's breads, cookies, and crackers, Franco-American's gravies and pastas, V8 vegetable juices, Swanson broths, and Godiva's chocolates. David Johnson was president and CEO from 1990 until 1997.

Campbell Soup has invested heavily in advertising since its inception, and many artifacts of its promotional campaigns have proven valuable in the Americana collectible advertising market. Perhaps best known are the "Campbell's Kids" designed by illustrator Grace Drayton. Ronald Reagan was a spokesman for V8 when Campbell's acquired the brand in 1948.

In addition to collectible advertising, the company has had notable commercial sponsorships. Among these was Orson Welles's The Campbell Playhouse, which had previously been The Mercury Theatre on the Air. After the program's adaptation of The War of the Worlds became a sensation for accidentally starting a mass panic due to its realism, Campbell's took over as sponsor of the radio theater program in December 1938.

Shutdown of factories 
The shutdown of Campbell's original plant in Camden, New Jersey, plant No. 1 was announced in 1989 with production ending the night of March 1, 1991; the plant was officially closed the following day. The plant was demolished on November 1, 1991. Plants in Pocomoke City (Maryland), Crisfield (Maryland), and Smyrna (Tennessee) also shut down.

Plant No. 2, originally a tomato-processing plant, shut down in 1980. It was responsible for about 35% of all Campbell's products in the 1950s. Products included pork and beans, tomato juice, V8 vegetable juice, Franco-American spaghetti, macaroni and cheese, and soups (notably: bean with bacon, cream of mushroom, cream of celery, and cream of asparagus.

A total of 2,800 jobs were lost, 940–1,000 of those jobs from the Camden plant. Campbell's agreed to give workers one week's payment for each year of employment as well as paying in full for six months of medical benefits, and paying half the cost for another six months. Salaried workers received one week's pay for each year of employment. Production was moved to plants in Napoleon (Ohio), Paris (Texas), and Maxton (North Carolina).

Recent history 
In the UK and Ireland, Campbell Soup was rebranded as Batchelors Condensed Soup (UK) and Erin (Ireland) in March 2008, when the license to use the brand name expired. Premier Foods, St. Albans, Hertfordshire bought the Campbell Soup Company in the UK and Ireland for £450 million ($830 million) in 2006, but was licensed to use the brand only until 2008. Under this agreement, the US-based Campbell Soup Company continued to produce Campbell's Condensed Soup but could not sell the product in the UK for a further five years.

Campbell's continues to be a major part of Camden, regularly participating in charity events in the community. In 2009, Campbell's completed the construction of a new and expanded headquarters in the city.

In January 2010, Campbell's Canadian subsidiary began selling a line of soups that are certified by the Islamic Society of North America as being halal (prepared in accordance with Islamic law). Although Campbell does not have any plans to sell its halal soups in the United States, the move has drawn criticism from anti-Muslim critics in the United States. Several bloggers called for a boycott of the company, but Campbell's spokesman John Faulkner stated at the time that the company did not notice any effect on its sales as a result.

In November 2007, Campbell's Soup sold Godiva to Yildiz Holding.

In July 2011, Campbell's Soup decided to once again sell its product in the UK after being absent since 2008. Symingtons began manufacturing the brand under license. The new line-up comprised twelve cup soups, five simmer soups designed to be cooked in a pot of water, four savoury rice lines, and four savory pasta and sauce packets. The new range were not sold in cans, but instead in packets and boxes. Later in 2011, the canned varieties also returned to supermarket shelves with refreshed labels and new lines.

In 2012, Campbell announced plans to buy Bolthouse Farms, a maker of juices, salad dressings and baby carrots, for $1.55 billion. Analysts saw this as an attempt to reach younger, more affluent consumers.

From 2012, Campbell Soup has been focused on updating their image and digital marketing to increase visibility among younger generations.

In June 2013, Campbell acquired the Danish multinational baked goods company Kelsen Group for an undisclosed amount. Kelsen has an 85-country distribution network and is seen as providing Campbell with opportunities for international expansion, particularly into China and other Asian markets.

In June 2015, Campbell Soup acquired salsa maker Garden Fresh Gourmet for $231 million as it looked to expand into the fresh and organic packaged foods business.

In December 2017, Campbell's completed the acquisition of Pacific Foods of Oregon, LLC for $700 million and announced the agreement to acquire the snack company Snyder's-Lance for $4.87 billion in cash. The latter deal is the largest in the company's history.

The company announced in January 2018 that their only Canadian factory, in Toronto, would close. Production would shift to three existing facilities within the U.S. It was reported that the expected loss of jobs, as a result of the closing, would be 380.

Denise Morrison served as the company's president and CEO from 2011 through 2018.

On December 21, 2018, Mark Clouse, former CEO of Pinnacle Foods, was named the next Campbell's CEO, effective January 22, 2019.

Having sold over $450 million a year worth of Chunky Soup from 2004 to 2017, Campbell's asked for a trademark on "Chunky", which was approved in 2019.

In July 2019, Campbell's agreed to sell its stake in the Kelsen Group for $300 million to a subsidiary of Ferrero SpA, with the transfer to be completed in 2020. Campbell's also divested Arnott's Biscuits to KKR for $2.2 billion at the same time.

Pop art

In 1962, artist Andy Warhol took the familiar look of the Campbell's soup can and integrated it into a series of pop art silkscreens, a theme he would return to off and on through the 1960s and 1970s. The first batch in 1962 were a series of 32 canvases. At first, the cans were accurate representations of actual Campbell's cans, but as his series progressed, they became more surrealistic, with Warhol experimenting with negative-reversed color schemes and other varied techniques (many of these which would be used on other Warhol paintings of the period, such as his celebrity silkscreens of the 1960s). The silkscreens themselves have become iconic pieces of pop art, with one in particular, Small Torn Campbell Soup Can (Pepper Pot) (1962), commanding a price of $11.8 million at auction in 2006.

Slogans
 Mmm Mmm Good (1935–present; their predominantly used slogan)
 Give Me The Campbell Life (1969–75)
 Soup Is Good Food (1975–c.1982)
 Never underestimate the power of soup! (1990s)
 Possibilities (2005–2009)
 So Many Many Reasons It's So Mmm Mmm Good (2009–2010)
 It's Amazing What Soup Can Do! (2010–present)
 Made for real, Real life (2015–present)

Health issues
Many canned soups, including Campbell's condensed and chunky varieties, contain relatively high quantities of sodium and thus are not desirable for those on low-sodium diets. However, Campbell's Chunky, Healthy Request and other soups, as well as their V-8 and Tomato juices, are claimed by Campbell's to contain reduced sodium levels.

In fall 2007, Campbell's was awarded a Certificate of Excellence, for their efforts in lowering sodium levels, from Blood Pressure Canada.

By autumn 2009, Campbell's claimed it had lowered the sodium content in 50% of its soups range.
In March 2010, this claim was challenged. ABC News reported that the low-sodium variety of Campbell soup in fact contains the same amount of sodium as the regular variety, and that Campbell's Healthy Request soup contains more fat than the regular variety.

In December 2009, Consumer Reports found that major canned food companies including Campbell's Soup had tinned products which had bisphenol A (BPA) levels over 100 ppb in some cases; the testing revealed that just one serving of canned food would exceed an expert's recommendation for daily exposure (0.2 micrograms per kg body weight per day).

In July 2011, citing sinking sales, and a combination of: "consumer views and choices" and having "found no connection between sodium consumption and negative health outcomes" they increased the salt contents again.

GMO
Throughout 2012, Campbell's contributed $500,000 to a $46 million political campaign known as "The Coalition Against The Costly Food Labeling Proposition, sponsored by Farmers and Food Producers" This organization was set up to oppose a citizens' initiative, known as Proposition 37, demanding mandatory labeling of foods containing genetically modified ingredients sold in California.

In January 2016, the company  decided to support mandatory labeling and announced they would label their products that contained GMO additives.

Brands
Campbell's owns numerous brands that it markets worldwide. Among these are:

Campbell's

The company's flagship brand and the Campbell's name is used to market soups, sauces, and canned meals. Product lines under the Campbell's brand include:
Concentrated soups that are usually diluted with water or milk before eating
Campbell's Condensed Soups
Campbell's Healthy Request
Ready-to-eat soups that do not need additional water
Campbell's Chunky
Campbell's Chunky Maxx
Campbell's Home Style
Campbell's Soup on the Go
Campbell's Slow Kettle Style
Campbell's Well Yes
Other products
Campbell's Pork and Beans
Campbell's Spaghetti
Campbell's SpaghettiOs
Campbell's Ready Meals
Campbell's Sauces
Campbell's tomato juice
V8 vegetable juice

Pepperidge Farm
An American baked-goods company founded in 1937, it was acquired by Campbell's in 1961. The Pepperidge Farm brand is used by Campbell's to market:
Breads
Sandwich breads
Swirl breads
Pepperidge Farm buns and rolls
Farmhouse breads
Bagels
Stuffing
Ecce Pannis breads
Crackers
Goldfish crackers
Harvest Wheat
Classic Water
Golden Butter
Cookies
Milano
Farmhouse
Chunk
Distinctive
Pirouette
Desserts
Puff pastry
Layer cakes
Turnovers

Pace Foods
An American salsa company founded in 1947, it was acquired by Campbell's in 1995. The Pace brand is used by Campbell's to market salsas and picante sauce.

Swanson
Broth
TV dinners and frozen meals (made by Pinnacle Foods under license)
Canned chicken

Prego
Pasta sauces

Snyder's-Lance
Lance crackers and cookies
Snyder's of Hanover pretzels
Cape Cod Potato Chips
Kettle potato chips
Snack Factory pretzel chips
Archway Cookies

Late July Snacks
Late July Snacks is a subsidiary of the Campbell Soup Company, acquired in the Snyder's-Lance acquisition in early 2018. Snyder's-Lance had boosted their ownership stake in Late July Snacks to 80% in 2014.

Plants

United States
 Camden, New Jersey - World Headquarters, non-manufacturing.
 Maxton, North Carolina: Opened 1978
 Napoleon, Ohio
 Paris, Texas
 Milwaukee, Wisconsin
 Everett, Washington
 West Sacramento, California
 Tualatin, Oregon
 East Rancho Dominguez, California
 Rancho Cucamonga, California

International

 Toronto, Canada: Opened 1930 in St Marys, Ontario (closure announced in 2018)
 Shepparton, Victoria, Australia
 Lübeck, Germany Sold in 2013 to CVC Capital Partners and converted into Continental Foods BVBA.
 Selangor, Malaysia
 Kings Lynn, Great Britain: Opened 1959, closed 2007. Site demolished 2012.
 Bekasi, Indonesia (as PT. Arnotts Indonesia) until 2019 at which point Campbell Soup Company sold it to KKR.
 Ribe, Denmark until 2013 at which point Campbell Soup Company left the European market.
 Nørre Snede, Denmark until 2013 at which point Campbell Soup Company left the European market.

Recalls

2010
On June 22, 2010, Campbell's "SpaghettiOs and Meatballs" product was recalled after a Texas firm found possible traces of underprocessed meat in the product.

See also
 Cream of mushroom soup
 Green bean casserole
 List of food companies

Notes

References
 Collins, Douglas (1994). America's Favorite Food: The Story of Campbell Soup Company. Harry N. Abrams, Inc. .
 Shea, Martha Esposito, and Mathis, Mike (2002). Images of America: Campbell Soup Company. Arcadia Publishing. .
 Sidorick, Daniel (2009). Condensed Capitalism: Campbell Soup and the Pursuit of Cheap Production in the Twentieth Century. Cornell University Press. .

External links

 

 

1869 establishments in New Jersey
Brand name soups
 
Companies based in Camden, New Jersey
Companies listed on the New York Stock Exchange
Dorrance family
Food and drink companies established in 1869
Food manufacturers of the United States